La Noisette is a presently closed restaurant site, located at 164 Sloane Street in London, England.

History
Opened in the mid-1990s as private members club Monte’s, the kitchen was operated by a series of star chefs including multi-Michelin-starred chef Alain Ducasse, and in 2000 Jamie Oliver was appointed as chef-consultant, overseeing head chef Ben O’Donoghue.

In 2005, Gordon Ramsay Holdings approached Ian Pengelley, who opened Pengelley's on the site in 2005, which closed after a year. In 2007, GRH reopened the site as La Noisette, with chef patron Bjorn van der Horst in charge. Under his charge, the restaurant held a one star in the Michelin Guide.

Future
After closing in March 2009 as a restaurant, in light of the loss of private-dining capacity while the Savoy Hotel was closed due to refurbishment, GRH proposed to refurbish the site as a private dining venue.

References 

Restaurants in London
Michelin Guide starred restaurants in the United Kingdom
Defunct restaurants in London
Restaurants disestablished in 2009
Restaurants established in 1995